Bagele Chilisa is a Botswanan post-colonial scholar who has written and spoken extensively about indigenous research and evaluation methodologies. She is a full professor at the University of Botswana, where she teaches courses on social science research methods and evaluation research to undergraduate and graduate students. Chilisa has served as an evaluator on multiple global projects, and is considered to be an important "African thought leader." Chilisa identifies as a member of the Bantu people of Africa.

Biography
Chilisa was born and raised in the small village of Nshakazhogwe in Botswana. Her parents, Motlalepul and Zwambele Kenosi, were subsistence farmers. Her parents, and her grandmother, Ponya Kenosi, passed oral literature to her as a child, stimulating her lifelong interest in indigenous knowledge systems. In her book, Indigenous Research Methodologies (2012), Chilisa states:I belong to the Bantu people of Africa, who live a communal life based on a connectedness that stretches from birth to death, continues beyond death, and extends to the living and the nonliving. I am known and communicate in relational terms that connect me to all my relations, living and the nonliving. It is common for people to refer to each other using totems as well as relational terms such as uncle, aunt, brother, and so on. For instance, my totem is a crocodile, and depending on who is talking to me and on what occasion, I can be referred to using my totem.

Education
Chilisa credits her father with teaching her the alphabet before she began attending school. Because her family lived near a village granary, she also learned to count before she began formal schooling. She attended primary and secondary school in Botswana. From the University of Pittsburgh, Chilisa earned her Master of Arts degree in Research Methodology, and her PhD in Policy, Planning, and Evaluation.

Career
Chilisa is a full professor at the University of Botswana, housed in the Post Graduate Research and Evaluation Programme. She teaches courses in research methods and evaluation, and policy design. She teaches both graduate and undergraduate students at the University of Botswana.

Chilisa is a scholar of indigenous research methods, having published books and journal articles on the topic and spoken at national and international conferences. Her research focuses on communities in Botswana and other regions in southern Africa, but application of her ideas about indigenous research methods are worldwide. She is hailed as an "African thought leader driving the concept of African-rooted evaluation." In the preface to her important text, Indigenous Research Methodologies, Chilisa credits her father with instilling within her the "ways in which indigenous practices and values on connectedness and relational ways of knowing of the colonized Other could be valorized in research."

At the University of Botswana, Chilisa has an extensive record of service. She was a member of the board for the University of Botswana Centre for Scientific Research and Indigenous Knowledge and Innovations, as well as serving on the board of the University of Botswana Research Ethics Committee.

Chilisa has served non-governmental organizations (NGOs) as an evaluator for international projects including UNESCO, United Nations Development Programme (UNDP), the World Bank, the International Labour Organisation, and the United Nations Children's Fund. Chilisa has received multiple grants from international organizations to do research, including grants from the World Bank, the National Institute of Health (USA), and UNICEF. In 2018, Chilisa was appointed to serve on the United Nations Development Programme (UNDP) Evaluation Advisory Panel (EAP).

She co-founded the Botswana, Lesotho, Swaziland and Namibia Research Association, was the president of the Botswana Educational Research Association, and edited the Botswana Educational Research Journal.

Published works

 Brannelly, Tula, Rosalind Edwards, Melanie Nind, Helen Kara, Umut Erel, Helen Moewaka Barnes, Bagele Chilisa, and Amohia Boulton. (2017). "Reflective commentaries," Qualitative Research 17, no. 3: 351–355. doi:10.1177/1468794117698915
 Chilisa, Bagele. (1999). "New developments in the national examination system in Botswana." Educational Measurement: Issues & Practice, 18, no. 4: 28–29.  
 Chilisa, Bagele. (2000). "Towards equity in assessment: Crafting gender-fair assessment." Assessment In Education: Principles, Policy & Practice, 7(1), 61–81. doi:10.1080/713613318=
 Chilisa, Bagele. (2002). "National policies on pregnancy in education systems in Sub-Saharan Africa: the case of Botswana." Gender & Education, 14, no. 1: 21–35. doi:10.1080/09540250120098852
 Chilisa, Bagele. (2005). "Educational Research Within Postcolonial Africa: A Critique of HIV/AIDS Research in Botswana." International Journal Of Qualitative Studies In Education (QSE) 18, no. 6: 659–684. 
 Chilisa, Bagele. (2006). "'Sex' education: Subjugated discourses and adolescents' voices." pp. 249–261 in C. Skelton, B. Francis, L. Smulyan, C. Skelton, B. Francis, L. Smulyan (Eds.) The Sage handbook of gender and education. Thousand Oaks, CA: Sage Publications, Inc. doi:10.4135/9781848607996.n19
 Chilisa, Bagele. (2012). Indigenous research methodologies. Los Angeles, CA: Sage. 
 Chilisa, Bagele. (2017). "Decolonising transdisciplinary research approaches: an African perspective for enhancing knowledge integration in sustainability science." Sustainability Science, (5), 813. doi:10.1007/s11625-017-0461-1
 Chilisa, Bagele. (2014). "Indigenous research is a journey." International Journal Of Narrative Therapy & Community Work, no. 2: 41. 
 Chilisa, Bagele, Irene Mohiemang, Kolentino Mpeta, Tumane Malinga-Musamba, Poloko Ntshwarang, and G. Anita Heeren. 2013. "Why wait ‘til marriage? The determinants of premarital sex among adolescents in a country in Sub-Saharan Africa: Botswana." Journal Of Human Behavior In The Social Environment, 23, no. 8: 972–979. doi:10.1080/10911359.2013.831296
 Chilisa, Bagele, Thenjiwe Emily Major, and Kelne Khudu-Petersen. (2017). "Community engagement with a postcolonial, African-based relational paradigm." Qualitative Research, 17, no. 3: 326–339. doi:10.1177/1468794117696176 
 Chilisa, Bagele, Irene Mohiemang, Kolentino Nyamadzapasi Mpeta, Tumane Malinga, Poloko Ntshwarang, Bramwell Walela Koyabe, and G. Anita Heeren. (2016). "Contextualized theory-based predictors of intention to practice monogamy among adolescents in Botswana junior secondary schools: Results of focus group sessions and a cross-sectional study." Journal Of Human Behavior In The Social Environment, 26, no. 6: 533–540. doi:10.1080/10911359.2015.1114820
 Chilisa, Bagele, and Gabo Ntseane. (2010). "Resisting dominant discourses: implications of indigenous, African feminist theory and methods for gender and education research." Gender & Education, 22, no. 6: 617–632. doi:10.1080/09540253.2010.519578
 Chilisa, Bagele, and Gaelebale N. Tsheko. (2014). "Mixed methods in indigenous research: Building Relationships for Sustainable Intervention Outcomes." Journal Of Mixed Methods Research, 8, no. 3: 222–233. 
 Commeyras, Michelle, and Bagele Chilisa. (2001). "Assessing Botswana's first national survey on literacy with Wagner's proposed schema for surveying literacy in the ‘Third World’." International Journal Of Educational Development, 21, 433-446. doi:10.1016/S0738-0593(00)00074-2
 Gaotlhobogwe, Michael; Thenjiwe Emily Major; Setlhomo Koloi-Keakitse, and Bagele Chilsa. (2018). "conceptualizing evaluation in African contexts." New Directions for Evaluation, no. 159: 47–62. DOI: 10.1002/ev.20332
 Mertens, Donna M.; Fiona Cram; and Bagele Chilisa (ed.) (2013). Indigenous pathways into social research: Voices of a new generation. Walnut Creek, CA: Left Coast Press. 
 Nitza, Amy, Bagele Chilisa, and Veronica Makwinja-Morara. (2010). "Mbizi": Empowerment and HIV/AIDS prevention for adolescent girls in Botswana." Journal For Specialists In Group Work, 35, no. 2: 105-114. 
 Sanday, Peggy, Suniti Namjoshi, Ann Graham, Michele Janette, Helen Moffet, Michel Coconis, and Susan A. Comerford, et al. 2001. "Forum: What Challenges Do Feminists in the U. S. Face When Trying to Think Globally?." Transformations: The Journal Of Inclusive Scholarship And Pedagogy, 12, no. 1: 108–22.

Notes and references

20th-century women scientists
Botswana academics
Academic staff of the University of Botswana
University of Pittsburgh alumni
Living people
Year of birth missing (living people)
Bantu